Maths Pathway is an online educational website based in Melbourne, used in Australian schools to teach mathematics. It differs from traditional mathematics, as it is set up in a modular format, with students working on individual pieces of learning on a computer and worksheet. These tests are read on a laptop, and written on paper.

History 
Maths Pathway was created in 2015 by Richard Wilson and Justin Matthys, who were concerned about a student decline in mathematics skills. The development started as a small website headquartered in a shed in Matthys' lawn. According to the website, it is featured in over 250 schools and used by 57,000 students.

Features 
Math Pathway uses a modular format where students select their work based on what proficiency level they are at, as opposed to every student completing the same tasks. Students are then required to be tested on what they have learned every fortnight. To use Maths Pathway, schools must pay a fee for each student.

References

External links 
 

Educational math software
Australian companies established in 2015
Internet properties established in 2015
Australian educational websites
Online companies of Australia
Privately held companies of Australia
Companies based in Melbourne
Education companies of Australia
B Lab-certified corporations in Australia